"I've Got My Baby on My Mind" is a single by American country music artist Connie Smith. Released in November 1974, the song reached #13 on the Billboard Hot Country Singles chart. The song was issued onto Smith's 1975 studio album called I Got a Lot of Hurtin' Done Today/I've Got My Baby On My Mind. "I've Got My Baby on My Mind" was Smith third top twenty hit single issued under Columbia Records. Also, the song peaked at #31 on the Canadian RPM Country Tracks chart around the same time.

Chart performance

References 

1974 singles
Connie Smith songs
Songs written by Sanger D. Shafer
Song recordings produced by Ray Baker (music producer)
1974 songs
Columbia Records singles